Maksim "Max" Geller (מקס גלר; born April 20, 1971)  is an Israeli former Olympic wrestler.

Geller was born in Minsk, Belarusian SSR, and is Jewish.  He made aliyah (immigrated from the Soviet Union to Israel) in the late 1980s.

Wrestling career
Geller's club is Hapoel Tel Aviv, in Tel Aviv, Israel.  He won the Israeli championships in 1990 and 1991.

He won the silver medal at the 1991 European Championships, in 68.0 kg. Freestyle.

At the 1992 European Championships, in 68.0 kg. Freestyle, Geller came in 7th.

Geller competed for Israel at the 1992 Summer Olympics, in Barcelona, at the age of 21, in Wrestling—Men's Lightweight, Freestyle.  He defeated Jesús Eugenio Rodríguez of Cuba, lost to Fatih Özbaş of Turkey, and then faced Endre Elekes of Romania and both wrestlers were disqualified for passivity. When he competed in the Olympics, he was 5-7.5 (172 cm) tall, and weighed 157 lbs (71 kg).  He finished in 11th place.

At the 1994 World Championships, in 68.0 kg. Freestyle, Geller came in 11th.  At the 1994 European Championships, in 68.0 kg. Freestyle he also came in 11th.

References

External links
 

Olympic wrestlers of Israel
Soviet emigrants to Israel
Jewish wrestlers
1971 births
Wrestlers at the 1992 Summer Olympics
Living people
Israeli people of Belarusian-Jewish descent
Israeli male sport wrestlers
Soviet male sport wrestlers
Belarusian male sport wrestlers
Sportspeople from Minsk
Jewish Belarusian sportspeople
Soviet Jews